Moulshree is an Indian film and television actress and a model.

She was part of a show called naina balsawar (Zee TV). .

TV Shows
2009 - Dill Mill Gayye as Dr.Tamanna Patil.

Video albums
Babul supriyo (kuch aisa lagta hai)
Aaloyni (bheege chandani)
Aryans
Music video with vinal director
Album with harry & anand

References

External links
https://web.archive.org/web/20101026074259/http://www.pbase.com/saurabh_123/moulshree_sachdeva

Indian television actresses
Living people
Year of birth missing (living people)